David Jirka (born 4 January 1982 in Jindřichův Hradec) is a Czech rower.

References
 
 

1982 births
Living people
Czech male rowers
Olympic rowers of the Czech Republic
People from Jindřichův Hradec
Olympic silver medalists for the Czech Republic
Rowers at the 2004 Summer Olympics
Rowers at the 2008 Summer Olympics
Olympic medalists in rowing
Medalists at the 2004 Summer Olympics
World Rowing Championships medalists for the Czech Republic
European Rowing Championships medalists
Sportspeople from the South Bohemian Region